Sergiy Stakhovsky was the defending champion, but lost in the first round to Benjamin Becker.
Mikhail Kukushkin defeated 1st seed Mikhail Youzhny 6–3, 7–6(7–2) to win this tournament.

Seeds

Draw

Finals

Top half

Bottom half

References
 Main Draw
 Qualifying Draw

St. Petersburg Open - Men's Singles
St. Petersburg Open
2010 in Russian tennis